Muhammad ibn Munkadir (died 747), also known as Ibn al-Munkadir or Muhammad al-Taymi, was a prominent tabi'i (plural: taba'een) and reciter of the Qur'an, who transmitted a number of hadith.

Notes

Year of birth missing
747 deaths
Tabi‘un
8th-century Arabs
Tabi‘un hadith narrators